Meet Dave is a 2008 American science fiction comedy film directed by Brian Robbins and written by Bill Corbett and Rob Greenberg. It stars Eddie Murphy in the title role, Elizabeth Banks, Gabrielle Union, Ed Helms, Scott Caan and Kevin Hart.  The film was released on July 11, 2008 and grossed $50 million against a $60 million budget.

Plot 
In his New York City apartment, a young boy named Josh Morrison stares through his telescope at an object falling from the sky. It is a golf-ball-sized metal ball that flies through the window and lands in his fishbowl, quickly draining the water along with the goldfish. He decides to show it at his school's science class presentation.

Three months later, a massive fireball crashes into the water near Liberty Island. It is revealed to be a spaceship that resembles a human, controlled by 100 tiny humanoid aliens. Its Captain pilots the spaceship from the command deck located in its head, with the help of his second-in-command Number 2, and researcher Number 3. The spaceship looks very human, and displays numerous superpowers, but the aliens don't know how to make the "ship" act like a human. A superstitious cop named Dooley desperately searches for the alien.

The aliens need to save their planet, Nil, from an energy crisis. They need salt, which they plan to take by draining the Earth's oceans using the metal ball, so they have to recover the ball. After the spaceship is hit by Josh's single mother, Gina Morrison while driving, the Captain decides to befriend Gina and Josh. He tells them his name is Dave Ming Chang, based on a quick scan of common Earth names. At Gina's home the crew see their missing ball in a photograph taken at the science presentation. After having breakfast with Gina, "Dave" goes to Josh's school where he pretends to be a substitute teacher and eventually is able to talk to Josh alone. Josh tells him that the ball was taken from him by a bully. With Josh's help, Dave takes the metal ball back from the bully.

The Captain (via Dave) spends some time with Josh and Gina and realizes that humans are more advanced than they originally thought. The crew observes humans displaying feelings and love, such as witnessing Gina's painting or a homeless man offering to share his blanket with Dave when he sleeps in a doorway. The Captain decides to cancel the plan to drain the oceans because it would destroy life on Earth. The police track Dave down using the impression of his face found in the dirt at the crash site and they arrest him. After spending so much time on Earth, most of the crew begin to exhibit new "feelings", adopting Earth's culture, mannerisms and general laid-back attitude. Believe that the Captain and the rest of the crew's changing behavior is ruining their mission, Number 2 takes command of the "ship" and imprisons the Captain. Under Number 2's command, Dave breaks out of the police station and another attempt is made to arrest him. Number 3, who has become infatuated with the Captain, becomes jealous of Gina. She first cooperates in the command change but later agrees with the Captain's view on humans. Both are caught by Number 2 and they are expelled from the spaceship. In the meantime, Number 17, a young, fun-loving alien, jumps out of the "ship" while drunk from the alcohol Dave has imbibed. The Captain apologizes to Number 3 for ignoring her. He admits that he too loves her and wants to be with her. Back at the police station, Dooley discovers Number 17 in his coffee and interrogates him to find out where Dave is going.

Number 2 takes Dave to the harbor, where he tries to throw the metal orb into the ocean, but is stopped by the Captain and Number 3, both of whom managed to gain reentry back onto the ship. They convince the rest of the crew that the real Captain is in charge again. Reinstated, he orders Number 2 to be stuck in the ship's "butt" forever. The metal orb meanwhile slips out of Dave's hand and rolls into the ocean. The Captain attempts to retrieve the orb but is told that they only have enough power to either retrieve it or return home. The Captain decides to save the Earth and the rest of the crew agrees. The ball, thrown in the ocean by Number 2, is retrieved. Dave powers down while Dooley and his partner catch up and point their guns at him. With no power, Dave's shields are disabled, leaving the crew defenseless. Josh tries to tell the police officers that Dave is harmless but is ignored. He then grabs Dooley's taser which he uses on Dave, recharging him. The Captain and Number 3 reveal themselves to the police officers who stand down. The Captain says goodbye to Josh and Gina saying he now understands love. Number 17 is then returned to Dave by Dooley. About to fly away, a team from the FBI arrives and throws a net over Dave. While the FBI agents wrestle the body down, "Dave's" crew evacuates to one of the ship's "lifeboat" shoes, activate the engines, detaches the shoe and heads home to Nil, leaving behind both the ship and Number 2. While in the lifeboat, the Captain asks for Number 3's hand in marriage. She accepts and they kiss.

Cast 
 Eddie Murphy as Dave Ming Chang and The Captain (Number 1)
 Elizabeth Banks as Gina Morrison
 Gabrielle Union as Number 3
 Ed Helms as Number 2 / Master Xaviax
 Marc Blucas as Mark Rhodes
 Scott Caan as Officer Dooley
 Kevin Hart as Number 17
Yvette Nicole Brown as Betty, an Old Navy Saleswoman.
 Mike O'Malley as Officer Stevie Knox
 Austyn Lind Myers as Josh Morrison
 Pat Kilbane as Number 4 / Johnny Dazzles
 Tariq Bah as Marcus Grill
 Miguel A. Núñez Jr. as Number 12
 Adam Tomei as Number 35
 Allisyn Ashley Arm as Nerdy Girl

Production 

Screenwriter Bill Corbett originally pitched the story for SciFi.com, the website for the Sci Fi Channel, which previously aired Mystery Science Theater 3000, where Corbett worked as a writer and actor. The concept was eventually dropped and Corbett, along with other MST3K alumni, instead developed the online mini-series The Adventures of Edward the Less for the site. Corbett later revived the idea for a movie and discussed it with friend and fellow writer Rob Greenberg, who would become his screenwriting partner for the project. Although both writers acknowledged several other "little people inside big people" movies had been made in the past, Corbett thought the aspect of an entire Star Trek like crew operating a human being bore some originality.

During filming, Meet Dave was transferred from Paramount Pictures (which released many of Murphy's early films) to 20th Century Fox (which released Dr. Dolittle).

Meet Dave was written under the title Starship Dave, but studio executives insisted on a title change in part because of the poor box office performance of The Adventures of Pluto Nash, a 2002 science-fiction comedy that also starred Eddie Murphy. Corbett said the executives also wanted the title changed because they felt having any semblance of science-fiction in the title would isolate a large percentage of audiences. Corbett unsuccessfully argued against the new title, which he described as "beyond generic" and said was repetitive of a comedy released earlier in the year called Meet Bill.

Although the project as it was originally conceived appealed to both children and slightly older audiences, the final script aimed for a much more solidly family-based audience. Corbett and Greenberg wrote the original draft and some subsequent drafts and, although they were given the sole writing credit, Corbett said other writers "have romped through the script as well," including one unnamed writer who spent one week adding material after the final draft was submitted. A large amount of improvising and rewriting was also done on the set, and Corbett and Greenberg had little creative control during filming. Corbett said most of the people they worked with were pleasant and some of the notes from the studio were helpful, but that Meet Dave ultimately suffered from a "too-many-cooks thing."

Filming was expected to begin in March 2007. As of early June, they were filming scenes at the Statue of Liberty in New York City. There was also some filming in early 2007 at an elementary school in Pasadena, California.

Soundtrack 

The soundtrack album for the film was composed by John Debney and released by Varèse Sarabande. Debney recorded his score with the Hollywood Studio Symphony at the Newman Scoring Stage in February 2008.

Release 
Meet Dave began receiving criticism and virulence months before it was actually released, especially by die-hard film fans, Corbett compared to the Comic Book Guy character in The Simpsons. Greenberg enjoyed reading the negative comments on the Internet Movie Database, whereas Corbett said he would "rather take an acid bath" than read them. Corbett, who did not see the final film until after it was widely released, said he did not know how the final result would come out:

Murphy skipped the Meet Dave premiere, claiming it was because he was working on the (subsequently-delayed) comedy A Thousand Words – even though Robbins, who had directed both films, was at the premiere. Screenwriter Bill Corbett also missed the premiere, which he said was due to family plans, "not an act of protest, per se".

Box office 
Meet Dave grossed $11.8 million in the United States and Canada and $38.8 million in other territories for a worldwide total of $50.7 million, against its production budget of $60 million.

The film opened on July 11, 2008, in 3,011 theaters in North America and grossed $5.3 million, ranking seventh at the box office. 20th Century Fox distribution executive Bert Livingston said, "It was a tough concept to get across. It's upsetting for all of us and for Eddie. He's very funny in this. Just not enough people came."

In its third weekend, it broke the record for the highest number of theater drops for a film in wide release, losing 2,523 theaters (77%). It held the record until Live by Night was dropped from 2,659 theaters (94.1%) in January 2017.

Reception

Critical response 
On Rotten Tomatoes the film has an approval rating of 20% based on 102 reviews, with an average rating of 4.30/10. The site's critical consensus reads, "Easy gags and slack direction drag this occasionally clever alien-out-of-planet comedy down to unimaginative lows." On Metacritic, the film has a score of 43 out of 100, based on reviews from 26 critics, indicating "mixed or average reviews". Audiences polled by CinemaScore gave the film a grade "B" on scale of A to F.

Peter Travers of Rolling Stone gave the film a negative review and wrote: "Murphy, teaming again with his Norbit director Brian Robbins, is assuming we'll all line up for lazyass toilet jokes and pay for the privilege. Prove him wrong, people, please." Claudia Puig of USA Today wrote: "If only the movie had heeded its own advice and tried to be different from the standard formula. We might have enjoyed the powerful force of this big star and his gift for physical comedy if the movie offered fresh scenarios and fewer predictable jokes."

Joe Leydon of Variety  gave it a positive review and wrote: "Aimed squarely at the same family audiences that flocked to Murphy's "Doctor Dolittle" comedies, this is a lightly amusing and surprisingly sweet Fox release."

Other response 
The film's poor performance became a joke for comedians. Jay Leno said that the film's title was going to be changed to Meet Dave: At Blockbuster, insinuating that the movie should have been a straight-to-DVD release. In the also Fox-produced Family Guy episode "Friends of Peter G", during the "Mr. Booze" song number, Carl mentioned that since he started drinking, he has never left his couch and has seen every movie ever made. Meet Dave is the first movie called out, and Carl mentions he has seen it.

Bill Corbett said he would love to record a Meet Dave track on RiffTrax, a site featuring downloadable audio commentaries recorded by Mystery Science Theater 3000 alum Michael J. Nelson and other regular commentators, including Corbett. Corbett said the track was not likely to ever be recorded since comedies rarely work as spoofs. A reference to the film was included in the RiffTrax Presents commentary for Planet of the Apes recorded by Matthew J. Elliott (in which he suggested that the filmmaker's original intention had been to launch Charlton Heston's character into space inside a giant Eddie Murphy), as well as the commentary for The Day After Tomorrow recorded by Corbett and Kevin Murphy, in which Corbett claims the natural phenomena hitting Los Angeles were "almost as big a Hollywood disaster as Meet Daves box office".

Eddie Murphy singled out Meet Dave as one of the worst movies he ever made.

Accolades

It was nominated for two Razzie Awards, Worst Actor (Eddie Murphy) and Worst Screen Couple (Eddie Murphy in Eddie Murphy).

References

External links 

 
 
 
 

2000s science fiction comedy films
2008 comedy films
2008 films
20th Century Fox films
American science fiction comedy films
Dune Entertainment films
2000s English-language films
Films about size change
Films directed by Brian Robbins
Films scored by John Debney
Films set in New York City
Regency Enterprises films
2000s American films